Peter Johnston Jr. (January 6, 1763–December 8, 1831) was a Virginia military officer, lawyer, politician and judge. Raised in Prince Edward County, which he represented for many terms in the Virginia House of Delegates (and served as that body's Speaker 1805-1807). During the last two decades of his life, Johnston served as judge of the southwest Virginia Circuit and resided in Abington.

Early life and education 

His mother, the former Martha Butler, was a widow when she married his Scottish-born father, Peter Johnston (d. 1786). Johnson, a merchant, emigrated to Virginia and initially conducted business at Osborne's on the James River before moving to Prince Edward County. He established a plantation known as "Longwood", became one of the burgesses for that county, and also donated the land which ultimately became Hampton-Sydney College. This man, his son, attended Hampden-Sydney College, until he volunteered for military service in 1780.

Military career

Johnston volunteered to join Lee's Legion at age 17, and first held the rank of Lieutenant. He resigned that position in 1782, and joined the light corps formed by General Greene, as an adjutant with the rank of Captain. After being mustered out at the end of the Revolutionary War, Johnston served with the Virginia militia, rising to the rank of brigadier general of militia.

Personal life

Johnston married Mary Wood, the daughter of Valentine Wood and Lucy Henry (a sister of Patrick Henry). One of their son became Confederate General Joseph E. Johnston.

Career

Johnston's father operated his Prince Edward county plantation using enslaved labor, as is indicated by the 1787 Virginia tax inventory, which showed the estate owning 11 enslaved adults and 16 enslaved children, as well as seven horses and 42 other livestock. In the last census before his death, he owned more than 30 slaves in Washington County, Virginia. 

Prince Edward County voters first elected Johnston as one of their representatives in the Virginia House of Delegates in 1792, and re-elected him until 1794. His last term ended in 1811. He succeeded Hugh Holmes, who was elected to become a judge, and served as that body's Speaker from 1805 until 1807. His speech concerning the celebrated resolutions of 179801799 was published in the "Register", then a leading paper in the new county.

In 1811, legislators elected Johnston as judge on the general and superior court for the 13th district, which included Prince Edward County. However, he exchanged with Judge William Brockenbrough, who had been assigned to the southwest Virginia circuit. Thus he moved to near Abingdon, Virginia, where he lived at "Panticello".

Death and legacy

Johnston died at his "Panicello" home and was buried nearby. Descentends included John W. Johnston, Peter Carr Johnston, Beverley Randolph Johnston, Charles C. Johnston, Benjamin Johnston, Mrs. Jane C. Mitchell and Algernon Sidney Johnston.

References

List of former Speakers of the House of Delegates, in the old House chamber in the Virginia State Capitol
:File:Virginia Historical Markerwww.makerhistory/longwood-estate-marker-m-33/

1763 births
1831 deaths
People from Prince Edward County, Virginia
Members of the Virginia House of Delegates
Speakers of the Virginia House of Delegates